Rob Matthaei (born 20 September 1966 in Amsterdam) is a Dutch professional football coach and a former player who played as a midfielder.

He is the uncle of Marc Klok, who is currently representing Indonesia at international level.

1966 births
Living people
Dutch footballers
Eredivisie players
HFC Haarlem players
De Graafschap players
FC Volendam players
Dutch expatriate footballers
Expatriate footballers in Scotland
Scottish Premier League players
Motherwell F.C. players
Dunfermline Athletic F.C. players
AFC DWS players
Footballers from Amsterdam
Association football midfielders